Nazi Party Election Results presents a series of tables that summarize the election results of the Nazi Party in German national and state elections. They display the number of votes received, the percentage of the vote, the Party's numerical ranking, the number of parliamentary seats won and the change in the number of seats.

 The national data track the results of all parliamentary and presidential elections that the Party contested from its re-founding in 1925 throughout the existence of the Weimar Republic and the Third Reich, ending with the last Reichstag election in 1938. 

 The state tables provide election results in the seventeen landtage (state parliaments) during the Weimar period only, from the Party's reestablishment in 1925 through the elections of 1932. The "Provisional Law on the Coordination of the States with the Reich" was enacted on 31 March 1933 and directed that the existing elected landtage were to be reconstituted on the basis of each party's share of the votes received in the Reichstag election of 5 March. This was followed by the Law on the Reconstruction of the Reich, which was passed on 30 January 1934, abolishing the state landtage altogether and transferring the sovereign rights of the states to the Reich government, thus effectively replacing the German federal system with a unitary state. No subsequent state elections were conducted.

Tables of national election results

German Reichstag

German Presidency

Tables of state Landtag election results

Anhalt

Baden

Bavaria

Bremen

Brunswick

Hamburg

Hesse

Lippe

Lübeck

Mecklenburg-Schwerin

Mecklenburg-Strelitz

Oldenburg

Prussia

Saxony

Schaumburg-Lippe

Thuringia

Württemberg

References

Sources

 

Elections in Nazi Germany
Elections in the Weimar Republic
Nazi Party